Full Metal Panic! is an anime television series based on the Japanese light novel of the same name written by Shoji Gatoh and illustrated by Shiki Douji. The anime series was produced by Gonzo Digimation and originally aired in 2002 after its original air date was canceled because of the September 11 attacks. The series was licensed by ADV Films for North American release in 2003.

A second season titled, Full Metal Panic! The Second Raid, was announced on October 29, 2004, and was directed by Yasuhiro Takemoto. It aired from July 13, 2005, to October 19, 2005.

A third season titled, Full Metal Panic! Invisible Victory, was announced on October 22, 2016, and aired from April 13, 2018, to July 18, 2018.

Series overview

Episode list

Season 1 (2002)

Season 2 (2005)

Season 3 (2018)

References

Full Metal Panic!
Full Metal Panic! episodes